Patrick Sommer (born 10 September 1976) is a German former professional tennis player.

Born in Neu-Ulm, Sommer reached a career high singles world ranking of 560. He had a best ranking of 219 in doubles and as a doubles player won an ATP Challenger tournament in Lübeck in 1999, partnering Franz Stauder.

Challenger/Futures titles

Doubles

References

External links
 
 

1976 births
Living people
German male tennis players
People from Neu-Ulm
Sportspeople from Swabia (Bavaria)
Tennis people from Bavaria